Bamboo Skateboards is a Fallbrook, California skateboard brand and manufacturer of skateboards made from bamboo from managed forests.  Formed in 2008, by a team of entrepreneurs, it is owned by Mark Gregson and Hal Miller.

Originally named “BambooSK8” the name was changed to Bamboo Skateboards in 2012.  During that year, they were awarded “Best New Skateboards of 2012” by “skateboarding magazine.”  

Bamboo skateboards sells skateboard decks, longboard completes, wheels, as well as eco-friendly softgoods and apparel.  Its longboards include drop-throughs, pintails, double-kicks, square tails and mini cruisers.

Team
Zach Curtis

Past am skate team members:
Ryan Strader
David Kahn
Mikee Brown
Jeff Wright
Alex Marshall
Terrence Marshall

External links
Official website

References

Skateboarding companies